Xyroptila oksana is a moth of the family Pterophoridae which is endemic to the island of Java.

References

External links

Moths described in 2006
Endemic fauna of Indonesia
Moths of Asia
oksana